Nürnberg-Gleißhammer station is a railway station in Nuremberg, Bavaria, Germany. It is located on the Nuremberg–Feucht line of Deutsche Bahn. It is served by the S2 of the Nuremberg S-Bahn.

History
The Haltepunkt was built in 1920 for the staff of the marshalling yard living in its vicinity and served by the Nürnberg Hauptbahnhof–Nürnberg Rangierbahnhof passenger trains. In 1927 it was opened for general passenger traffic and from 3 June 1984 it was served by the regional trains of N3 line (R5A from 27 September 1987). In the course of the construction work for the S-Bahn line S2, it was rebuilt to meet the requirements of the S-Bahn and returned to service on 22 November 1992.

References

Gleißhammer
Gleißhammer
Railway stations in Germany opened in 1920